Louis Hugo Manske (July 4, 1884 – April 27, 1963) was a pitcher in Major League Baseball.

Manske started his professional baseball career in 1904. From 1905 to 1906, he was a starter for Des Moines of the Western League. He went 20–16 in 1905, and Des Moines won the pennant. The following season, he was 23–10 when he was purchased by the Pittsburgh Pirates in August. He appeared in two major league games for them.

In 1907, Manske was sent down to the American Association. His career ended in 1910.

External links
 Statistics and History at Baseball-Reference.com

1884 births
1963 deaths
Major League Baseball pitchers
Pittsburgh Pirates players
Baseball players from Milwaukee
Milwaukee Brewers (minor league) players
Des Moines Underwriters players
Des Moines Champs players
Minneapolis Millers (baseball) players
St. Joseph Drummers players